The stolid flycatcher (Myiarchus stolidus) is a species of bird in the family Tyrannidae.
It is found in Hispaniola (Dominican Republic and Haiti), and Jamaica.
Its natural habitats are subtropical or tropical dry forest, subtropical or tropical moist lowland forest, subtropical or tropical mangrove forest, and heavily degraded former forest.

References

stolid flycatcher

Endemic birds of the Caribbean
Birds of Jamaica
Birds of Hispaniola
Birds of the Dominican Republic
Birds of Haiti
stolid flycatcher
stolid flycatcher
Taxonomy articles created by Polbot